Martintelep or Martin-Kertváros (in Slovak: Martinská osada or Martinská Predmestie) is a residential area of the city of Miskolc, Hungary. Unlike many other districts that are on the outskirts on the city, Martintelep has never been an independent town.

The area was first mentioned in 1908 as the estate of Károly Martin near the classification yard. Károly Martin was the founder and first commander of the fire brigade in Miskolc; today not only the garden town, but also a street bears his name.

On June 2, 1944 the US Airforce bombed the railway station and classification yard of Miskolc. Because of its proximity to the bombed areas Martintelep suffered some damages. The attack claimed 206 lives in the city and 420 people were wounded.

The residents of the area disliked the name Martintelep (mostly because the -telep part, meaning "settlement" is often part of the name of Gypsy settlements.) The district was officially renamed to Martin-Kertváros (kertváros means "garden town") on September 5, 2002, however, in colloquial speech it is still called Martintelep by everyone but its residents.

Martintelep is one of the quietest and most peaceful areas of the city. It can be reached by buses 3, 3A from the city itself.

Neighbourhoods of Miskolc